Foolproof is a synonym for idiot-proof, an assurance, meaning a device that can't be damaged by improper use, and may refer to:

 Foolproof (film), a 2003 Canadian heist film
 "Foolproof", a 1996 song by Canadian country music group Desert Dolphins
 "Foolproof", a 2021 song by Hayden James, Gorgon City and Nat Dunn
 FoolProof, a financial education initiative